Gérard Dériot (born 1 November 1944) is a member of the Senate of France. He represents the Allier department and is a member of the Union for a Popular Movement Party.

Functions 
He was president of the General council of Allier from 1992 to 1998 and from 2001 to 2008, and of the Departmental Council of Allier from 2 April 2015 to 25 September 2017.

 President of the communes community (communauté de communes) of Pays de Tronçais
 Former mayor of Cérilly
 General councillor of former canton of Cérilly (1985–2015)
 Departmental councillor of canton of Bourbon-l'Archambault (duo with Corinne Trebosc-Coupas)

References
Page on the Senate website

People from Allier
1944 births
Living people
French Senators of the Fifth Republic
Union for a Popular Movement politicians
Senators of Allier
The Republicans (France) politicians

Cérilly, Allier